Ivo Prskalo  (born 2 January 1948 in Čapljina, Yugoslavia (present-day Bosnia and Herzegovina), died 2 September 2010 in Sydney, Australia) was a Croatian-born Australian international association footballer who played for Marconi Fairfield in the National Soccer League.

Club career
Prskalo began his senior career with Velež Mostar in the Yugoslav First League. He made 168 appearances in nine seasons with the club, establishing himself as a key defender in the squad managed by Sulejman Rebac. He emigrated to Australia for the inaugural season of the National Soccer League in 1977, joining Marconi Fairfield where he featured in every match under former Socceroos head coach Rale Rasic.

The pinnacle of his club career came in 1979, where at the age of 31, he claimed the honour of NSL Player of the Year in Marconi's championship year under Les Scheinflug.
He retired from club football in 1982 at the age of 34, having amassed 141 appearances with the Sydney-based club.

International career
Prskalo made his international debut for Australia at the Sydney Sports Ground in 1979, where Australia were defeated by a touring Partizan Belgrade. His first official 'A' international came later that year against Taiwan in a friendly played in Taipei. His only international goal was a ninth-minute penalty against Czechoslovakia the following year at Olympic Park in Melbourne. In all, he made 27 appearances for his adopted country, 14 of which were 'A' internationals.

Honours
With Velež Mostar:
 Yugoslav First League: 1972–73
With Marconi Fairfield:
 NSL Championship: 1979; 1977 (Runners-Up)
 NSL Cup: 1980; 1977 (Runners-Up)
Personal honours:
 NSL Player of the Year: 1979 with Marconi Fairfield

References

External links
 OzFootball profile
 Velež Mostar statistics
 
 Socceroos Internationals for 1979
 Socceroos B Matches for 1979
 Socceroos Internationals for 1980

1948 births
2010 deaths
People from Čapljina
Australian soccer players
Australian expatriate soccer players
Australia international soccer players
National Soccer League (Australia) players
Association football defenders
Marconi Stallions FC players
FK Velež Mostar players
Yugoslav emigrants to Australia